Donald Peter Turner (May 30, 1934 – September 18, 2017) was an American photographer.

In 1986, Turner published his first monograph, Pete Turner Photographs (Abrams). His second book, Pete Turner African Journey (Graphis Inc., 2001), documents Turner's many adventures in Africa, beginning with his trek in 1959 from Cape Town to Cairo with Wally Byam's famous Airstream caravan.  The Color of Jazz (Rizzoli, 2006) is a comprehensive collection of his provocative album covers for CTI Records among many others.

Life and work
Critic A. D. Coleman described the work of Turner as having "A dramatist's sense of event, intense and saturated coloration, and a distinct if indescribable otherness are omnipresent in Turner's images".

He graduated from the Rochester Institute of Technology in 1956 along with classmates Bruce Davidson and Jerry Uelsmann.

Photo District News voted him as one of the 20 most influential photographers of all time and in 1981 the American Society of Media Photographers (ASMP) awarded him its Outstanding Achievement in Photography honor.

His photographs are in the permanent collections of many major museums, including the Maison Européenne de la Photographie (MEP), the Tokyo Metropolitan Museum of Photography and International Center of Photography (ICP) in New York. The George Eastman House in Rochester is the depository of Turner's life's work and where his retrospective exhibition, Pete Turner: Empowered by Color, opened in 2007.

Turner died September 18, 2017, at his home on Long Island, New York.

Contributions to LP covers
The Sound of New York, Kenyon Hopkins – ABC Paramount, 1959
Lonelyville 'The Nervous Beat, The Creed Taylor Orchestra – ABC Paramount, 1959
The Best of the Barrack Ballads, The Creed Taylor Orchestra – ABC Paramount, 1959
The Blues and the Abstract Truth, Oliver Nelson – Impulse!, 1961
Motion, Lee Konitz – Verve, 1961
Perceptions, Dizzy Gillespie – Verve, 1961
Focus, Stan Getz – Verve, 1961
In a Latin Bag, Cal Tjader – Verve, 1961
Live at the Village Vanguard, John Coltrane – Impulse!, 1962
The Quintessence, Quincy Jones – Impulse!, 1962
Further Definitions, Benny Carter – Impulse!, 1962
Statements, Milt Jackson – Impulse!, 1962
Count Basie and the Kansas City 7, Count Basie – Impulse!, 1962
All the Sad Young Men, Anita O'Day – Verve, 1962
Saturday Night/Sunday Night, Cal Tjader – Verve, 1962
Pike's Peak, The Dave Pike Quartet – Epic, 1962
Coltrane, John Coltrane – Impulse!, 1962
 Night Train Oscar Peterson – Verve, 1963 
Wave, Antônio Carlos Jobim – CTI, 1967
Soft Samba Strings, Gary McFarland – Verve, 1967
A Day in the Life, Wes Montgomery – A&M, 1967
Trust in Me, Soul Flutes – A&M/CTI, 1967
We and the Sea, Tamba 4 – A&M/CTI, 1968
Samba Blim, Tamba 4 – A&M/CTI, 1968
Down Here on the Ground, Wes Montgomery – A&M/CTI, 1968
Road Song, Wes Montgomery – A&M/CTI, 1968
Soul Machine, Richard Barbary – A&M/CTI, 1968
Have You Meet Miss Jones, Artie Butler – A&M/CTI, 1968
Glory of Love, Herbie Mann – A&M/CTI, 1968
You, Baby, Nat Adderley – A&M/CTI, 1968
Shape of Things to Come, George Benson – A&M/CTI, 1968
When It Was Done – Walter Wanderley – A&M/CTI, 1968
Moondreams – Walter Wanderley – A&M/CTI, 1969
Summertime, Paul Desmond – A&M/CTI, 1968
Betwixt & Between, J.J. Johnson & Kai Winding – A&M/CTI, 1969
Walking In Space, Quincy Jones – A&M/CTI, 1969
Tell It Like It Is, George Benson – A&M/CTI, 1969
Calling Out Loud, Nat Adderley – A&M/CTI, 1969
Courage, Milton Nascimento – A&M/CTI, 1969
From The Hot Afternoon, Paul Desmond – A&M/CTI, 1969
Gula Matari, Quincy Jones – A&M/CTI, 1970
Tide, Antônio Carlos Jobim – A&M/CTI, 1970
Starbones, J.J. Johnson & Kai Winding – A&M/CTI, 1970
Sugar, Stanley Turrentine – CTI, 1970
Crying Song, Hubert Laws – CTI, 1970
Stone Flower, Antônio Carlos Jobim – CTI, 1970
Joe Farrell Quartet, Joe Farrell – CTI, 1970
Black Out, Fats Theus – CTI, 1970
Montreux II, Bill Evans – CTI, 1970
California Concert, CTI All Stars – CTI, 1971
Straight Life, Freddie Hubbard – CTI, 1971
Beyond the Blue Horizon, George Benson – CTI, 1971
Salt Song, Stanley Turrentine – CTI, 1971
First Light, Freddie Hubbard – CTI, 1971
Outback, Joe Farrell – CTI, 1971
God Bless The Child, Kenny Burrell – CTI, 1971
Gilberto with Turrentine, Astrud Gilberto – CTI, 1971
Killer, Alice Cooper – Warner Bros., 1971
Shebaba, Bola Sete – Fantasy, 1971
Afro-Classic, Hubert Laws – CTI, 1972
White Rabbit, George Benson – CTI, 1972
Free, Airto Moreira – CTI, 1972
All the King's Horses, Grover Washington, Jr. – Kudu, 1972
Soul Story, Charles Earland – Prestige, 1972
Morning Star, Hubert Laws – CTI, 1972
Time & Love, Jackie & Roy – CTI, 1972
Sky Dive, Freddie Hubbard – CTI, 1972
Prelude, Deodato – CTI, 1973
Sunflower, Milt Jackson – CTI, 1973
Fingers, Airto Moreira – CTI, 1973
Blue Moses, Randy Weston – CTI, 1973
Blues Farm, Ron Carter – CTI, 1973
Keep Your Soul Together, Freddie Hubbard – CTI, 1973
Giant Box, Don Sebesky – CTI, 1973
Upon This Rock, Joe Farrell – CTI, 1974
Goodbye, Milt Jackson – CTI, 1974
Higher Ground, Johnny Hammond – Kudu, 1974
Skylark, Paul Desmond – CTI, 1974
Rambler, Gabor Szabo – CTI, 1974
She Was Too Good To Me, Chet Baker – CTI, 1974
Bad Benson, George Benson – CTI, 1974
A Wilder Alias, Jackie & Roy – CTI, 1974
Olinga, Milt Jackson – CTI, 1974
Gambler's Life, Johnny Hammond – Salvation, 1974
Concierto, Jim Hall – CTI, 1975
Canned Funk, Joe Farrell – CTI, 1975
I Hear A Symphony, Hank Crawford – Kudu, 1975
Good King Bad, George Benson – CTI, 1976
Black Widow, Lalo Schifrin – CTI, 1976
The San Francisco Concert, Hubert Laws – CTI, 1977
Greatest Hits, Steely Dan – ABC, 1978
Space, George Benson – CTI, 1978
Pulsion, Jacques Loussier – CBS, 1979
Night Passage, Weather Report – CBS, 1980
Silk, Fuse One – CTI, 1981
Studio Trieste, Jim Hall/Chet Baker/Hubert Laws – CTI, 1982
N.Y. Connection, David Matthews – Electric Bird, 1982
Gershwin Carmichael Cats, Roland Hanna – CTI, 1983
In My Life, Patti Austin – CTI, 1983
Red On Red, Claudio Roditi – CTI, 1984
Live at Felt Forum, Deodato – CTI/CBS, 1988
Rhythmstick, Dizzy Gillespie and CTI Records All-Stars – CTI, 1990
Song of the Sun, Jim Beard – CTI, 1991
We Are Family '93, Sister Sledge – Atlantic, 1993
Grooves In The Temple, Jorge Pescara – JSR, 2005
Live at Montreux 2009, CTI All Stars – CTI, 2010
Saga, Rodrigo Lima – JSR, 2014

References

External links
 Official Site
 New York Times
 Photo District News 
 George Eastman House
 Digital Photo Pro Interview
 Pop Photo Master Class
 Shutterbug Interview
 Doug Payne – Sound Insights

1934 births
2017 deaths
Artists from Albany, New York
Deaths from cancer in New York (state)
Photographers from New York (state)
Rochester Institute of Technology alumni